Home is the eighth album by Dutch band The Gathering. The album was released on 15 April 2006 by Sanctuary Records through its heavy metal label Noise. The album had a separate release in North America which took place on 18 April 2006 by Brooklyn-based label The End Records. It was the last album to feature lead singer and lyricist Anneke van Giersbergen.

In an interview for the San Diego-based magazine Modern Fix, drummer Hans Rutten described Home as being "more stripped-down...Souvenirs was quite structured and was quite heavy to make.  This one is more simple, I think, but still there, still in a Gathering kind of way.  But rhythmically speaking, it's more stripped-down, it's more primitive, I think.  I think 'primitive' is a good word...it's more instinctive (and) more primitive.  It's not as layered as Souvenirs, and maybe it's less 'trippish.'  Maybe it's more...yeah, primitive trip-rock, something like that."

Track listing

Charts

Personnel 
 Anneke van Giersbergen – vocals, guitars
 René Rutten – guitars, flute
 Marjolein Kooijman – bass
 Hans Rutten – drums
 Frank Boeijen – keyboards

Production
 Artwork – Michel de Klein
 Lyrics by – Anneke van Giersbergen
 Mastered by – Darius van Helfteren
 Photography by [cover picture taken by] – Thomas Rausch
 Producer, engineer, mixed by – Attie Bauw

References

External links 
 Home lyrics on official website

The Gathering (band) albums
2006 albums
The End Records albums
Noise Records albums